This is a list of sugar manufacturers in Uganda.

Large sugar manufacturers
Established sugar manufacturers in Uganda:
 GM Sugar Uganda Limited
 Kakira Sugar Works
 Kinyara Sugar Works Limited
 Sango Bay Estates Limited
 Sugar Corporation of Uganda Limited

Small sugar manufacturers
In November 2011, the Uganda government licensed a number of new sugar manufacturers, to address the sugar deficits that had hit the country.

 Amuru Sugar Works Limited – Amuru District
 Atiak Sugar Factory – Atiak, Amuru District
 Bugiri Sugar Factory – Bugiri District
 Buikwe Sugar Works Limited - Buikwe District
 Busia Sugar Limited – Busia District
 Hoima Sugar Limited
 Kamuli Sugar Limited – Kamuli District
 Kenlon Industries Uganda Limited – Buyende, Buyende District
 Kyankwanzi Sugar Works Limited – Kyankwanzi District
 Mayuge Sugar Industries Limited – Mayuge District
 Mukwano Sugar Factory –  Masindi District
 Sugar & Allied Industries Limited – Kaliro District
 Uganda Farmers Crop Industries Limited.

Output and market share

As of December 2014, the output and market share of each manufacturer is summarized in the table below:

 Totals may be a little off due to rounding.

In April 2020, Uganda's annual sugar output was estimated at 510,000 metric tonnes. With Uganda's annual consumption of 360,000 metric tonnes, approximately 150,000 metric tonnes annually are available for export.

As of November 2020, national sugar output was estimated at 550,000 metric tonnes annually. At the same time, annual national consumption was estimated at 370,000 metric tonnes. This leaves a surplus of approximately 180,000 metric tonnes annually. Due to refusal by three of Uganda's immediate neighbors (Rwanda, Kenya and Tanzania) to allow sugar imports from Uganda, the national sugar stockpile, as of November 2020, was estimated at 160,000 metric tonnes of crystalline sugar powder, worth about US$45 million. The country is now looking at regional markets, including Burundi, Democratic Republic of the Congo, South Sudan, Ethiopia and Zambia.

In February 2022, national sugar production was estimated at 600,000 metric tonnes annually, with national consumption of about 380,000 metric tonnes. That left approximately 220,000 metric tonnes available for export, annually. In October 2022, it was projected that the country would produce 822,000 metric tonnes in calendar year 2022. About 720,000 metric tonnes of that, would be brown table sugar and about 102,000 metric tonnes would be white industrial sugar.

See also
Alam Group
Madhvani Group
Mehta Group
Tirupati Development Uganda Limited 
Economy of Uganda
Sugar production in Uganda

References

External links
 Uganda: Sugar industry competition boosts farmers
 Government loses Shs93b  in revenue as Kakira sugar production falls
 How Uganda overtook Kenya in sugar cane production
 Raw sugar output by Uganda’s millers down 14 percent in H1:2016 – Reuters

Sugar companies of Uganda
Sugar manufacturers
Manufacturing in Uganda